Turanena is a genus of gastropods belonging to the family Enidae.

The species of this genus are found in Western Mediterranean, near Black Sea.

Species:

Turanena albolimbata 
Turanena albrechti 
Turanena andronakii 
Turanena bilgini 
Turanena boamica 
Turanena carpathia 
Turanena cochlicopoides 
Turanena cognata 
Turanena conelongata 
Turanena conicula 
Turanena demirsoyi 
Turanena diplochila 
Turanena elegantula 
Turanena forcartiana 
Turanena hemmeni 
Turanena herzi 
Turanena inversa 
Turanena katerinae 
Turanena kreitneri 
Turanena kuldshana 
Turanena leptogyra 
Turanena margaritae 
Turanena martensiana 
Turanena meshkovi 
Turanena microconus 
Turanena pseudobscura 
Turanena schuschaensis 
Turanena stschukini 
Turanena tenuispira 
Turanena tuccari 
Turanena zhoupengi 
Turanena zilchi

References

Enidae